Oparanthus is a genus of flowering plant in the family Asteraceae, native to the islands of French Polynesia.

 Species
 Oparanthus albus (F.Br.) Sherff - Marquesas 
 Oparanthus coriaceus (F.Br.) Sherff  - Rapa Iti
 Oparanthus hivoanus (O.Deg. & Sherff) R.K.Shannon & W.L.Wagner - Marquesas 
 Oparanthus intermedius Sherff - Rapa Iti
 Oparanthus rapensis (F.Br.) Sherff- Rapa Iti
 Oparanthus teikiteetinii (J.Florence & Stuessy) R.K.Shannon & W.L.Wagner - Marquesas 
 Oparanthus tiva W.L.Wagner & Lorence - Marquesas 
 Oparanthus woodii W.L.Wagner & Lorence - Marquesas

References

 
Asteraceae genera
Flora of French Polynesia
Taxonomy articles created by Polbot